Sirazi may refer to:
 something of, from or related to the Siraz region of northern India
 Sirazi language, an Indo-Aryan language
 Širāzi, an alternative spelling for Shirazi